Robert Gilchrist was the eighth mayor of Jersey City in New Jersey.

Born around 1790, Gilchrist became the president of the Jersey Board of Selectmen from 1835 to 1836. He succeeded Henry C. Taylor as mayor. He served two years from April 19, 1850 to May 2, 1852. He was succeeded by David S. Manners. Gilchrist was the Clerk of Hudson County from 1840 to 1865.

His son Robert Jr. became the Attorney General of New Jersey and served from 1870 to 1875.

See also
List of mayors of Jersey City, New Jersey

References

1866 deaths
Mayors of Jersey City, New Jersey
Year of birth missing